Stephanie Syjuco (born 1974, in Manila, Philippines), is a Filipino-American conceptual artist and educator. She currently lives and works in San Francisco

Career

Syjuco's artwork explores the friction between the authentic and the counterfeit, addressing political concerns regarding issues of labor and economies within the capitalist system. In 2009 she created Copystand: An autonomous manufacturing zone for the Frieze Art Fair in London. The Wall Street Journal notes: "Other artists, meanwhile, are openly toying with the fair's changing economics... San Francisco-based artist Stephanie Syjuco and several of her artist friends are making copycat versions of their favorite fair pieces, which she is selling at "heavily discounted" prices ranging from roughly $30 to $750."

She is an assistant professor at the University of California, Berkeley. She is represented by Catharine Clark Gallery in San Francisco. Her work is in the collection of the San Francisco Museum of Modern Art, Di rosa, and the Whitney Museum of American Art. She is the recipient of a 2014 Guggenheim Fellowship in Visual Arts and a 2009 Joan Mitchell Foundation Painters and Sculptors Program grant. In 2018, she was featured in the San Francisco Bay Area episode of PBS's Art21: Art in the 21st Century.

In 2011 Syjuco made Re-Edition Texts: Heart of Darkness.

In September 2019 Syjuco opened a large solo exhibition titled Rogue States at the Contemporary Art Museum St. Louis.

Education 
Stephanie Syjuco studied at the Skowhegen School of Painting and Sculpture (1997), the San Francisco Art Institute (BFA 1995), and Stanford University (MFA 2005).

Selected exhibitions
Exhibitions include a show at the Contemporary Art Museum St. Louis, "Being: New Photography" at the Museum of Modern Art, New York, "Public Knowledge," at the San Francisco Museum of Modern Art, Disrupting Craft: The Renwick Invitational (2018-2019) at the Smithsonian American Art Museum, and This site is under Revolution the Moscow Museum of Modern Art.

 2023 Recent Acquisitions: Stephanie Syjuco, Allen Memorial Art Museum, Oberlin College, Oberlin, Ohio
 2017 CITIZENS, Ryan Lee Gallery, New York, New York
 2016 Neutral Calibration Studies (Ornament + Crime), Catharine Clark Gallery, San Francisco, California
 2013 RAIDERS Redux, Catharine Clark Gallery Project Space, New York, New York
 2011 Currents Series: Stephanie Syjuco: Pattern Migration, Columbus Museum of Art, Ohio 
 2011 RAIDERS, Catharine Clark Gallery, San Francisco, California
 2010 notMOMA, Washington State University, Pullman, Washington
 2009 1969, PS1, New York
 2009 Unsolicited Fabrications, Pallas Contemporary Projects with 126 Artist-run Gallery, Dublin, Ireland
 2008 Perspectives Series 164: Total Fabrications, Contemporary Arts Museum Houston, Texas

Bibliography 
See, Sarita E. The Filipino primitive : accumulation and resistance in the American museum. New York: New York University Press, 2017. 
Hart, Dakin, and Jenny Dixon. Museum of stones : ancient and contemporary art at the Noguchi Museum. New York London: The Isamu Noguchi Foundation and Garden Museum in association with D Giles Limited, 2016. 
Syjuco, Stephanie. Comparative Morphologies: Complete Variations. 2008.
Syjuco, Stephanie. Misproductions: Stephanie Syjuco. 2006.
Johnstone, Mark, and Leslie Holzman. Epicenter : San Francisco Bay area art now. San Francisco: Chronicle Books, 2002.

Notes

External links
Stephanie Syjuco's website
Stephanie Syjuco in "San Francisco Bay Area", Art21
Interview with Stephanie Syjuco MoMA Audio: Being: New Photography 2018
Counterfeit Crochet Project
Stephanie Syjuco SPARK episode
Stephanie Syjuco: Pattern Migration at the Columbus Museum of Art, curated by Lisa Dent, Associate Curator of Contemporary Art
Reframed: Artists Seeking Social Change Bring the Public into the Picture KQED video
‘Alien She’ Exhibit Explores the Connection Between Punk Rock and Fine Art KQED article
Stephanie Syjuco artist talk: “Patterned Migration” at Museum of Contemporary Craft, Portland, June 12, 2014

American conceptual artists
Women conceptual artists
Artists from California
San Francisco Art Institute alumni
1974 births
Living people
American contemporary artists
Artists from the San Francisco Bay Area
21st-century American women artists
21st-century American artists